Leopold Müller may refer to:

 Leopold Müller (engineer) (1908-1988), Austrian engineer
 Leopold Müller (painter) (1834-1892), Austrian painter